Tanssii tähtien kanssa (Dances with Stars) is a Finnish version of the British BBC television series Strictly Come Dancing. The show has run on MTV3 since 3 March 2006, on Sunday evenings. The twelfth season was aired in the autumn 2019.

The show was originally hosted by Marco Bjurström and Ella Kanninen. Ella Kanninen left the show after the second season and was replaced by model and Season 2 contestant Vanessa Kurri. In 2009, Kurri was replaced by Vappu Pimiä after only one season. Marco Bjurstöm left the series after Season 4 and Mikko Leppilampi took over as host. Ella Kanninen returned to host the seventh season due to Pimiä's maternity leave; Pimiä returned to host the eighth season with Leppilampi.

A talk show Vappu tähtien kanssa (Vappu with the Stars) was broadcast during the fifth season of the main show. Based on Strictly Come Dancing: It Takes Two, it is a companion show to Tanssii tähtien kanssa. It aired during the run of the main show on MTV3 and was hosted by Vappu Pimiä, who also hosted the main show at the time.

The series' title is a pun on the title of the film Dances with Wolves, Tanssii susien kanssa.

Cast

Presenters

 Full time presenter
 Competed as a contestant before being a presenter

Judges

 Full time judge
 Competed as a contestant before being a judge

Professional partners 
Color key:

 Winner
 Runner-up
 3rd place
 Celebrity partner was eliminated first for the season
 Celebrity partner withdrew from the competition

Seasons

Series overview

Season 1 (2006)
Contestants:
 Tomi Metsäketo (tenor) partnered by Sanna Hirvaskari, eventual winners
 Kristiina Elstelä (actress) partnered by Marko Keränen, runners-up
 Jone Nikula (music executive, Idols judge) partnered by Katja Koukkula, sixth eliminated
 Keith "Keke" Armstrong (soccer coach) partnered by Helena Ahti-Hallberg, fifth eliminated
 Markus Pöyhönen (track athlete) partnered by Sanna Hento, fourth eliminated
 Katja Kannonlahti (news anchor) partnered by Jussi Väänänen, third eliminated
 Suvi Miinala (model, Miss Finland 2000) partnered by Juha Pykäläinen, second eliminated
 Leena Harkimo (member of Parliament) partnered by Erik Hento, first eliminated

Season 2 (2007)
Contestants:
 Mariko Pajalahti (musician) partnered by Aleksi Seppänen, eventual winners
 Sari Siikander (actress) partnered by Mikko Ahti, runners-up
 Sami Sarjula (actor) partnered by Sanna Hirvaskari, sixth eliminated
 Eppu Salminen (actor) partnered by Anna Sainila, fifth eliminated
 Jani Sievinen (swimmer) partnered by Helena Ahti-Hallberg, fourth eliminated
 Vanessa Kurri (model, Miss Finland 1999) partnered by Marko Keränen, third eliminated
 Roman Schatz (TV personality, writer) partnered by Saara Huovinen, second eliminated
 Pirkko Arstila (journalist, writer) partnered by Vesa Anttila, first eliminated
Singer Kirill Babitzin was to take part in the competition, but he suddenly died on 31 January. His place was taken by Schatz.

Season 3 (2008)
Contestants:
 Maria Lund (singer, actress) partnered by Mikko Ahti, eventual winners
 Nicke Lignell (actor) partnered by Susa Matson, runners-up
 Tuuli Matinsalo (athlete) partnered by Aleksi Seppänen, eighth eliminated
 Antti Kaikkonen (member of Parliament) partnered by Satu Markkanen, seventh eliminated
 Joonas Hytönen (TV personality) partnered by Kati Koivisto, sixth eliminated
 Vappu Pimiä (TV and radio personality) partnered by Jani Rasimus, fifth eliminated
 Merja Larivaara (actress) partnered by Janne Talasma, fourth eliminated
 Jimi Pääkallo (singer, actor) partnered by Anna Sainila, third eliminated
 Jyrki Anttila (tenor) partnered by Satu Suomi, second eliminated
 Sikke Sumari (TV personality, restaurateur) partnered by Daniel Ylimäki, first eliminated

Season 4 (2009)
Contestants:
 Satu Tuomisto (Miss Finland 2008, model) partnered by Janne Talasma eventual winners
 Pirkko Mannola (Miss Finland 1958, actress, singer) partnered by Mika Jauhiainen, runners-up
 Rosa Meriläinen (writer, ex-politician) partnered by Sami Helenius, eighth eliminated
 Wilson Kirwa (long-distance runner) partnered by Susa Matson, seventh eliminated
 Kim Herold (musician, ex-model) partnered by Sanni Siurua, sixth eliminated
 Miia Nuutila (actress) partnered by Vesa Anttila, fifth eliminated
 Bettina Sågbom (TV reporter) partnered by Jani Rasimus, fourth eliminated
 Mato Valtonen (musician, actor) partnered by Janica Mattsson, third eliminated
 Rolf Nordström (plastic surgeon) partnered by Nitta Kortelainen, second eliminated
 Simo Frangén (comedian) partnered by Satu Markkanen, first eliminated

Season 5 (2010)
Contestants:
 Antti Tuisku (singer) partnered by Anna-Liisa Bergström, eventual winners
 Laura Voutilainen (singer) partnered by Marko Keränen, runners-up
 Jukka Rasila (actor) partnered by Saana Akiola, eighth eliminated
 Joona Puhakka (diver) partnered by Sanni Siurua, seventh eliminated
 Nasima Razmyar (the refugee woman of 2010) partnered by Jani Rasimus, sixth eliminated
 Jethro Rostedt (CEO, took part in the second season of a Finnish version of the reality show The Apprentice) partnered by Susa Matson, fifth eliminated
 Satu Silvo (actress) partnered by Sami Helenius, fourth eliminated
 Maria Jungner (TV host) partnered by Aleksi Seppänen, third eliminated
 Juha Veijonen (actor) partnered by Sanna Hirvaskari, second eliminated
 Anna Perho (reporter) partnered by Janne Talasma, eliminated first

Season 6 (2011)
Contestants:
 Viivi Pumpanen (Miss Finland 2010, model) partnered by Matti Puro, eventual winners
 Jarppi Leppälä (Dudesons-star) partnered by Anna-Liisa Bergstrom, runners-up
 Jani Toivola (Member of Parliament, actor) partnered by Jutta Helenius, eight eliminated
 Mikko Parikka (actor) partnered by Katri Mäkinen, seventh eliminated
 Satu Ruotsalainen (former athlete, astrologist) partnered by Sami Helenius, sixth eliminated
 Jukka Tammi (former ice hockey player) partnered by Saana Akiola, fifth eliminated
 Siiri Nordin (singer) partnered by Jani Rasimus, fourth eliminated
 Anneli Sari (singer) partnered by Marko Keränen, third eliminated
 Veeti Kallio (actor, singer) partnered by Susa Matson, second eliminated
 Mari Perankoski (actress, screenwriter) partnered by Toni Rasimus, first eliminated

Season 7 (2012)
The seventh season aired in autumn 2012. Comedian Krisse Salminen won the season with Matti Puro, who also won the previous season.

Krisse Salminen (comedian) partnered by Matti Puro (Winner)
Antonio Flores (registered partnership of Pekka Haavisto) partnered by Disa Kortelainen (2. place)
Baba Lybeck (journalist) partnered by Mikko Ahti (3. place)
Sari Multala (competitive sailor) partnered by Sami Helenius (4. place)
Risto Kaskilahti (actor) partnered by Susa Matson (5. place)
Ristomatti Ratia (designer) partnered by Sanna-Maria Heikkilä (6. place)
Erja Lyytinen (musician) partnered by Markku Hyvärinen (7. place)
Amin Asikainen (boxer) partnered by Jutta Helenius (8. place)
VilleGalle (rapper) partnered by Kia Lehmuskoski (9. place)
Jippu (singer) partnered by Juri Trosenko (Last place)

Season 8 (2013)
The eighth season began on 15 September 2013. In this season, first time in the show's history, a competitor withdrew from the competition. Chef Harri Syrjänen injured his foot while practicing the dance and had to withdraw.   
 Raakel Lignell (musician) partnered by Jani Rasimus, eight eliminated but returned to competition; eventual winners
 Manuela Bosco (actress and former sprinter) partnered by Matti Puro, runners-up
 Harri Syrjänen (chef) partnered by Jutta Helenius, withdrew on 11 November 2013
 Sari Havas (actress) partnered by Mikko Ahti, seventh eliminated
 Juhani "Tami" Tamminen (ice hockey coach) partnered by Susa Matson, sixth eliminated
 Sami Hedberg (stand-up comedian) partnered by Anna Sainila, fifth eliminated
 Mert Otsamo (fashion designer) partnered by Ansku Bergström, fourth eliminated
 Mariska (singer) partnered by Aleksi Seppänen, third eliminated
 Juno (rapper) partnered by Kia Lehmuskoski, second eliminated
 Noora Karma (magician and mentalist) partnered by Janne Talasma, first eliminated

Season 9 (2014)
The ninth season began in October 2014 and ended in November 2014. 
 Pete Parkkonen (singer) partnered by Katri Mäkinen, winners
 Anu Sinisalo (actress) partnered by Jani Rasimus, runners-up
 Janna Hurmerinta (singer) partnered by Matti Puro, eighth eliminated
 Cristal Snow (presenter and actor) partnered by Kia Lehmuskoski, seventh eliminated
 Kaj Kunnas (sports commentator) partnered by Susa Matson, sixth eliminated
 Anne Kukkohovi (model) partnered by Marko Keränen, fifth eliminated
 Sonja "Soikku" Hämäläinen (YouTube celebrity) partnered by Jurijs Trosenko, fourth eliminated
 Tommi Evilä (long jump athlete) partnered by Jutta Helenius, third eliminated
 Kai Vaine (actor) partnered by Lumi Rae, second eliminated
 Sinikka Sokka (actress) partnered by Topi Vierimaa, first eliminated

Season 10 (2017)
Tenth season began on 12 February 2017.
Anna-Maija Tuokko (actress) partnered by Matti Puro, winners
Kirsi Alm-Siira (news anchor) partnered by Marko Keränen, runners-up
Laura Malmivaara (actress) partnered by Mikko Ahti, withdrew on 16 April 2017.
Eevi Teittinen (fitness athlete) partnered by Jani Rasimus, sixth eliminated
Musta Barbaari (rapper) partnered by Katri Mäkinen, fifth eliminated
Pepe Willberg (musician) partnered by Jutta Helenius, fourth eliminated
Ali Jahangiri (stand-up comedian) partnered by Saana Akiola, third eliminated
Hanna Sumari (television presenter & journalist) partnered by Sami Helenius, second eliminated
Kasmir (singer) partnered by Ansku Bergström, withdrew on 2 March 2017.
Jarkko Tamminen (actor & impersonator) partnered by Susa Matson, first eliminated

Season 11 (2018)
Eleventh season began on 16 September 2018.
Edis Tatli (boxer) partnered by Katri Mäkinen, winners
Hannes Suominen (actor) partnered by Kia Lehmuskoski, runners-up
Tuure Boelius (YouTube celebrity, singer) partnered by Ansku Bergström, third place
Marja Hintikka (television presenter) partnered by Matti Puro, seventh eliminated
Pekka Pouta (weather forecaster) partnered by Jutta Helenius, sixth eliminated
Jaana Pelkonen (politician) partnered by Marko Keränen, fifth eliminated
Lotta Näkyvä (model, Miss Finland 2013) partnered by Mikko Ahti, fourth eliminated
Aki Linnanahde (radio host & television presenter) partnered by Saana Akiola, third eliminated
Marita Taavitsainen (singer) partnered by Sami Helenius, second eliminated
Aino-Kaisa Saarinen (cross-country skier) partnered by Jurijs Trosenko, first eliminated

Season 12 (2019)
Twelfth season was between 22 September and 1 December 2019.

Christoffer Strandberg (actor, television host) partnered by Jutta Helenius, winners 
Jannika B (singer-songwriter) partnered by Aleksi Seppänen, runners-up  
Meeri Koutaniemi (photographer-journalist) partnered by Matti Puro, third place 
Laura Lepistö (figure skater) partnered by Marko Keränen, sixth eliminated 
Veronica Verho (radio host, YouTube celebrity) partnered by Jani Rasimus, fifth eliminated 
Olli Herman (rock singer) partnered by Katri Mäkinen, fourth eliminated
Timo Lavikainen (actor) partnered by Kia Lehmuskoski, third eliminated
Eini (singer) partnered by Sami Helenius, second eliminated
Mika Poutala (speed skater) partnered by Ansku Bergström, first eliminated
Mikael Jungner (politician) partnered by Saana Akiola, withdrew due injury

Once during the season, the teaching dance partners were changed for one week. This is why the first ever same-sex partners in the Finnish competition was seen on 3 November, with Christoffer Strandberg and Matti Puro performing a Paso Doble, and Meeri Koutaniemi and Katri Mäkinen dancing a Fox-trot.

Season 13 (2020)
Thirteenth season aired in autumn 2020.

Touko Aalto (politician) partnered by Jutta Helenius, first eliminated
Kristiina Halttu (actress) partnered by Aleksi Seppänen, second eliminated
Minna Parikka (fashion designer) partnered by Matti Puro, third eliminated
Shirly Karvinen (model) partnered by Jani Rasimus, fourth eliminated
Janina Fry (model) partnered by Anssi Heikkilä, fifth eliminated
Jesse Markin (musician) partnered by Claudia Ketonen, sixth eliminated
Sami Sykkö (journalist & presenter) partnered by Ansku Bergström, seventh eliminated
Jukka Hildén (performer, member of stunt group The Dudesons) partnered by Katri Mäkinen, eighth eliminated
Niklas Hagman (former ice hockey player) partnered by Kia Lehmuskoski, withdrew after testing positive for COVID-19
Jare Brand (rapper) partnered by Saana Akiola, third place
Miisa Rotola-Pukkila (YouTube celebrity) partnered by Marko Keränen, runners-up
Virpi Sarasvuo (former cross-country skier) partnered by Sami Helenius, winners

Season 14 (2021)
Fourteenth season aired in autumn 2021
Kari Kanala (vicar) partnered by Claudia Ketonen, first eliminated.
Elina Gustafsson (ex-boxer) partnered by Ansku Bergström, second eliminated.
Kristo Salminen (actor) partnered by Saana Akiola, third eliminated. In 19 September Salminen danced with Claudia Ketonen due his partner being sick
Mikael Gabriel (rapper, musician) partnered by Tiia Elg, fourth eliminated.
Viivi Huuska (photographer, director) partnered by Matti Puro, fifth eliminated.
Sita Salminen (writer, social media influencer) partnered by Aleksi Seppänen, sixth eliminated.
Kiti Kokkonen (actress) partnered by Marko Keränen, seventh eliminated
Jenni Poikelus (radio host) partnered by Sami Helenius, eighth eliminated
Aki Riihilahti (ex-football player) partnered by Katri Mäkinen, ninth eliminated
Waltteri Torikka (opera singer) partnered by Kia Lehmuskoski, 3rd placed 
Krista Siegfrids (singer, television host) partnered by Anssi Heikkilä, 2nd placed 
Ernest Lawson (actor, television host) partnered by Anniina Koivuniemi, winners

This season marked second time (since 12th season) when same-sex partner is presented, since Elina Gustafsson and Ansku Bergström are both women. In 17 October the teaching dance partners were changed for one week. Durin this week 6 out of 7 remaining partners were same-sex.

Season 15 (2022)
Season 15 will air in autumn 2022. Winner of the previous season, Ernest Lawson replaced Mikko Leppilampi as a shows host.
Evelina (singer) partnered by Marko Keränen, first eliminated
Katariina Kaitue (actress) partnered by Anssi Heikkilä, second eliminated
Joel Harkimo (entrepreneur) partnered by Tiia Elg, third eliminated
Alma Hätönen (radio host) partnered by Aleksi Seppänen, forth eliminated
Siim Liivik (ice hockey player) partnered by Katri Mäkinen, fifth eliminated
Maaret Kallio (writer, psychotherapist) partnered by Sami Helenius, sixth eliminated
Mikko Nousiainen (actor) partnered by Kerttu Nieminen, seventh eliminated
Signmark (rap artist) partnered by Anniina Koivuniemi, eighth eliminated. On October 30 Signmark danced with Katri Mäkinen during "Roosa nauha " prodcast due to Koivuniemi being sick. It was later announced that Mäkinen will dance with him for the rest of the season due to Koivuniemi withdrawing.
Jaakko Loikkanen (news anchor) partnered by Ansku Bergström, third place.
Sonja Kailassaari (television host) partnered by Matti Puro, runner-up.
Benjamin Peltonen (singer) partnered by Saana Akiola, winners.

This season marks the first time when there is a deaf student (Signmark) and a "second generation" student (Joel Harkimo, whose mother, Leena Harkimo competed at the first season).

References

External links
 Official website

Dancing with the Stars
2006 Finnish television series debuts
Dance competition television shows
2000s Finnish television series
2010s Finnish television series
2020s Finnish television series
Finnish reality television series
Finnish music television series
Finnish television series based on British television series
MTV3 original programming